Ariana Jollee (born September 29, 1982) is a former American pornographic actress and director of Italian and Russian descent.

Career
Jollee got into the adult film industry in March 2003 at around 20 years old after promoting herself on her homemade website. She was recruited by a production manager from Anabolic Video. Her first adult films were Nasty Girls 30 and Spring Chickens 4.

In 2004, she traveled to Prague to perform in 65 Guy Creampie (Devil's Film 2005) where she had sex with 65 men over six hours and, in the same year, signed a directing contract with Anarchy Films and Python Pictures. Her first movie under the contract was The Narcassist. Jollee also directed the Mayhem series Young Bung. She was only supposed to perform in the movie but replaced Lauren Phoenix as director when Phoenix left the production over creative differences.

Awards
 2005 AVN Award – Best Group Sex Scene, Video (Orgy World 7)
 2005 XRCO Award – Superslut of the Year
 2006 XRCO Award – Superslut of the Year

References

Further reading

External links

 
 
 

American pornographic film actresses
American pornographic film directors
American female adult models
Women pornographic film directors
Pornographic film actors from New York (state)
People from Long Island
Living people
1982 births
American people of Jewish descent
21st-century American women
American people of Italian descent
American people of Russian descent